The Maine Insane Hospital, later the Augusta Mental Health Institute (AMHI), was a psychiatric hospital in Augusta, Maine.  It was the principal facility for the care and treatment of Maine's mentally ill from 1840 to 2004, and its surviving buildings represent the oldest surviving complex of mental care facilities in the United States.  The complex is located on the east bank of the Kennebec River, immediately south of the former Kennebec Arsenal, and now primarily houses state offices.  The hospital was replaced by the Riverview Psychiatric Center in 2004, located just to the south.  The hospital's core complex was listed on the National Register of Historic Places in 1982, with the listing enlarged to encompass the entire campus in 2001.

Description and history
The Maine Insane Hospital is located on Augusta's east side bounded on the east by Hospital Street and the west by the Kennebec River, which separates the hospital from the state capitol complex.  The National Historic Landmark Kennebec Arsenal, a former federal military facility, lies just to the north, and the modern complex of the Riverview Psychiatric Center is located just to the south.  The hospital complex is a sprawling collection of buildings, most built of brick or stone, dating from the hospital's founding in 1840 to the mid-20th century.

From 1841 to 1845, psychiatrist Dr. Isaac Ray served as the hospital's superintendent.  In that role Ray was one of the original thirteen founding members of the Association of Medical Superintendents of American Institutions for the Insane.

The buildings are reflective of changing trends in the treatment of the mentally ill over that period of time.  The oldest portions of the complex are known as the Administration and Stone Buildings.  Now at the center of a series of connected buildings, they were built in 1836–40 to a design by Hallowell architect John Lord.  To these were added stepped wings (in keeping with the then fashionable Kirkbride Plan) in the 1850s and 1860s; these were designed by Francis H. Fassett, with later alterations designed by George M. Coombs.  In the 1880s, when "pavilion housing" prevailed as the preferred method for housing the mentally ill, a number of smaller outlying buildings were added, based on a master plan developed by Francis Fassett in the 1870s.  The pavilion housing plan proved uneconomical for the large numbers of patients, and dormitory-style buildings were built, combining patient wings, housing for workers, and an administrative hub.  The campus also includes a number of utilititarian service buildings, and was landscaped to provide an attractive environment to the patients.

The complex remained in continuous use until 2004, when the Riverview Psychiatric Center went into operation.  As the patient population declined in the 20th century, spurred in part by changing trends in treatment methods, elements of the complex were repurposed to other uses, primarily state offices.

See also
National Register of Historic Places listings in Kennebec County, Maine

References

External links
State of Maine - Augusta Mental Health Institute timeline

Psychiatric hospitals in Maine
Hospital buildings on the National Register of Historic Places in Maine
National Register of Historic Places in Augusta, Maine
Italianate architecture in Maine
Buildings and structures in Augusta, Maine
Historic districts on the National Register of Historic Places in Maine
1840 establishments in Maine